Franco-Gabonese relations are the current and historical relations between France and Gabon. Both nations are members of the Organisation internationale de la Francophonie and the United Nations.

Pre-independence relations
 

France first came into contact with people from Gabon when France signed protection treaties with local chiefs in 1839 and 1841. France officially claimed Gabon as a territory in 1885 as part of the scramble for Africa. Administration by France began in 1903 and in 1910, Gabon became part of the newly formed federation of French Equatorial Africa. Gabon lasted as part of the colonial federation until 1959. During World War II, Gabon was held by Vichy French forces from June to November 1940, but following the Battle of Gabon the colony was controlled by Free French forces. In August 1960, Gabon attained independence from France along with the other territories of the former French Equatorial Africa.

Since independence

Since independence, Gabon has been "one of France's closest allies in Africa". During the 1960s Gabon was France's sole source of Uranium and the French government therefore saw its relationship with Gabon as critical to its Force de frappe (nuclear deterrent). In the early 1960s the French government also established a policy goal of "energy independence" however with the loss of its control over French Algeria it came to rely heavily on Gabon for its oil needs. In February 1964 French troops helped to overthrow the Gabonese regime during the 1964 Gabon coup d'état and French citizens spread rumors of American involvement in the coup which led to the 1964 United States Embassy in Libreville bombings.

Omar Bongo Era
Omar Bongo ruled Gabon from 1967 until his death in 2009 and allowed extensive French military, political and economic involvement between Gabon and its former colonial master. Elf, the French national oil company, had extensive business dealings with Bongo's regime and Gabon was used a military staging point for French sponsored military actions throughout Africa.

As of 2008, around 10,000 French nationals live and work in Gabon, while the 6th Marine Infantry Battalion of the French military is also stationed there. When Gabonese president Omar Bongo died on June 7. 2009, Nicolas Sarkozy and Jacques Chirac were the only western heads of state to attend his funeral.

Ali Bongo Ondimba Era

Omar Bongo's son, Ali Bongo Ondimba, took power following his father's death. Ali Bongo held on to power after the 2016 election despite widespread claims of voter fraud, including by French foreign ministry officials.

Resident diplomatic missions
 France has an embassy in Libreville.
 Gabon has an embassy in Paris.

See also
 Françafrique
 French West Africa
 Gabonese people in France

References

 
Gabon
Bilateral relations of Gabon
Relations of colonizer and former colony